Jim Leeker (born St. Louis, Missouri) is a former U.S. soccer player and the current president of the St. Louis Soccer Hall of Fame.  He was the 1970 North American Soccer League Rookie of the Year and went on to play a total of three seasons in the league.

In 1965, Leeker joined St. Louis Kutis S.C.  He then went on to attend St. Louis University where he played on the men's soccer team from 1966 to 1969.  In 1969, Leeker and his teammates won the NCAA Men's Soccer Championship.  In 1970, Leeker signed with the St. Louis Stars of the North American Soccer League (NASL).  That year, he played in twenty-two games and scored five goals as he was named the NASL Rookie of the Year. On March 19, 1971 Leeker scored the first goal in NASL indoor history in the eighth minute of the opening match of the NASL's "Hoc-Soc" Tournament played at the St. Louis Arena. He continued to play for the Stars until 1972 when he left the NASL.  After leaving the Stars, Leeker rejoined St. Louis Kutis where he was named the 1972 Khoury Professional Player of the Year.

Leeker was inducted into the St. Louis Soccer Hall of Fame in 1998.

References

External links
 NASL stats

1947 births
Living people
American soccer players
Saint Louis University alumni
Saint Louis Billikens men's soccer players
North American Soccer League (1968–1984) players
North American Soccer League (1968–1984) indoor players
Soccer players from St. Louis
St. Louis Stars (soccer) players
St. Louis Kutis players
Association football forwards